Edwin G. Struck (March 27, 1905 – September 24, 1981) was an American football coach. He was the 13th head football coach at  Illinois State Normal University—now known as Illinois State University–in Normal, Illinois, serving for 20 seasons, from 1945 to 1964, and compiling a record of 86–78–14.

Head coaching record

References

1905 births
1981 deaths
Illinois State Redbirds football coaches